Iran and Georgia have had relations for millennia, although official diplomatic relations between the two nations in the 20th century were established on May 15, 1992. Georgia is represented by its embassy in Tehran, while Iran has its representative embassy in Tbilisi. Iran is an important trade partner of Georgia.

Context
Eastern Georgia, throughout its history, has several times been annexed by the Persian Empire, specifically under the Achaemenid, Parthian, Sassanid, Safavid, Afsharid and Qajar dynasties. Western Georgia, throughout its history had been annexed by the Persian Achaemenids and briefly came under Sassanid control during the Lazic War. Due to this, there has been a lot of political and cultural exchange between the two nations for thousands of years, and thus Eastern Georgia was considered a part of Greater Iran.

Historical relations

Iran (Persia) and Georgia, or the Georgian tribes, have had relations in different forms mainly through trade starting from the Median era. From the early Achaemenid era, relations developed, as the Achaemenids conquered many of the Georgian regions. The relationship got more complex as the Safavids took power in Iran and established century long Iranian control of several of the Georgian kingdoms. This continued until Russia conquered the Caucasus and Georgia in the first half of the 19th century, through the Russo-Persian War (1804-1813) and the Russo-Persian War (1826-1828), from Qajar Iran.

20th century
Until the early 1990s, Iran-Georgia relations were merged into Iran-Soviet relations. Since Georgia's independence from the Soviet Union, the two nations have cooperated in many fields including energy, transport, trade, education, and science. Iran is one of Georgia's most important trading partners and an Intergovernmental Joint Economic Commission is functioning between the two countries.

2008 Russia–Georgia conflict
Due to its close relations with both Russia and Georgia, Iran at first attempted to remain relatively neutral throughout the war and beyond. Foreign Ministry spokesman Hassan Ghashghavi called "for an immediate halt to the clashes" and offer to help.

After Russia and its closest allies chose to recognize Abkhazia and South Ossetia, the Ambassador of Iran to Russia, Seyed Mahmoud-Reza Sajjadi, said in early February 2009 that his nation will not recognise Abkhazia and South Ossetia's independence in the near future, "as it can cause war in many areas," but on the other hand he did not rule out eventual Iranian recognition of the independence of the two areas. However, Sajjadi defended Russia's measures in the 2008 South Ossetia war and its decision to recognise Abkhazia and South Ossetia as independent nations. Sajjadi also said he sympathised with the people of Abkhazia and South Ossetia and that Tehran will work with Moscow to develop the two areas' economy.

2010 to present

The beginning of 2010 saw increasing cooperation between the two countries. Agents from Iran's foreign ministry visited Tbilisi in May 2010 to discuss Iranian investment in the construction of a hydroelectric plant in Georgia as well as Iran's intentions to import electricity from the country. The meeting led to president Mikheil Saakashvili inviting his Iranian counterpart Mahmood Ahmadinejad to Tbilisi.

Over the past decade, Tehran has also assigned agreements with Tbilisi for elimination of double taxation and encouraging investment in air, surface, and sea transport, and customs and trade cooperation. Seeking to diversify transit routes for its cargo shipments, Iran has an interest in Georgia's transit capacity and considers the country to be a viable alternative route for shipping freight to Europe. It is expected

In late May 2010 Iranian ambassador Majid Samadzade Saber announced that Iran and Georgia intend to lift visa restrictions for travel between the countries, which officially came in force in January 2011. According to the Iranian Ambassador, Iran and Georgia are holding talks on opening an Iranian consulate in Batumi, western Georgia. The announcement was scheduled during Iranian foreign minister Manouchehr Mottaki's visit to Tbilisi scheduled later in the month.

During a meeting with new Georgian Ambassador to Iran Ioseb Chakhvashvili in Tehran in April 2014, Zarif said Iran and Georgia enjoy historical and friendly relations. The Iranian foreign minister added that there are many capacities for the expansion of Tehran-Tbilisi ties, particularly in the economic and parliamentary spheres.

Chakhvashvili, for his part, pointed to cordial Iran-Georgia ties and the ample grounds for closer cooperation between the two countries.  On November 18, 2013, Georgian President Giorgi Margvelashvili said his administration would strive to strengthen Tbilisi-Tehran friendship bonds.

Georgia has reacted positively on the outcome between Iran and the P5+1 states about the relief of sanctions on Iran, in turn for regulations of Iran's nuclear program. As close geographical countries and being important trade partners, parliamentarians of both nations foresee an increase in bilateral relations between the nations.

On March 18, 2015, the 5th Summit of Iran-Georgia Joint Commission on Economic Cooperation was held in the Ministry of Labor and Social Affairs of Iran.

In May 2015, Iranian energy company MEPCO group announced its plans to build two power plants in Georgia.

Ambassadors of Iran to Georgia
Feraidoun Haqbeen (1993–1996)
Aqbar Aminian (1996–1999)
Aboulfazl Khazaii Torshizi (1999–2002)
Hossein Aminian Toosi (2002–2006)
Mojtaba Damirchilou (2006–2010)
Majid Samarzade Saber (2010–present)

Ambassadors of Georgia to Iran
Jemshid Giunashvili (1994–2004)
Levan Asatiani (2004–2009)
Giorgi Janjgava (2009–2013)
Ioseb Chakhvashvili (2013–present)

Diplomacy

Republic of Georgia
Tehran (Embassy)

Republic of Iran
Tbilisi (Embassy) 
Batumi (Consulate-General)

See also 
 Foreign relations of Georgia
 Foreign relations of Iran
 Iranian Georgians

References

External links
 Ali Attār, Georgians in Iran, in Persian, Jadid Online, 2008, گرجی تباران ایران | جدید آنلاین.A Slide Show of Georgians in Iran by Ali Attār, Jadid Online, 2008, Untitled Document (5 min 31 sec).

 
Bilateral relations of Iran
Iran
Relations of colonizer and former colony